Po secretu vsemu svetu, "In secret to the whole world", is a 1976 Soviet two-part television film produced by Belarusfilm. It is adapted from Victor Dragunsky's popular children's book The Adventures of Dennis, a collection of short stories told from the perspective of a young boy.

Plot
The movie is about a boy named Denis and his adventures with friends and family. It is divided into two episodes, each in turn covering several stories from the book.

Cast

 Vladimir Stankevich — Dennis Korablev
 Аlеxei Sazonov— Mishka Elephants
 Georgy(Zhora) Belov — Burin Ljovka
 Alexander Lenkov—  Viktor Korablev, Dennis's Dad 
 Valentina Telichkina - Asya Korableva
 Alexandra Klimova — Raisa Ivanovna, teacher of literature
 Regina Korokhova - Marya Petrovna, the friend of Dennis's mother, who promised a lot, but did not keep her word
 Arkady Trusov - Uncle Pasha, the janitor
 Alexander Sherstobaev - Vanya Dykhov
 Alexandra Klimova - Raisa Ivanovna, teacher of literature
 Regina Korokhova - Marya Petrovna, the friend of Den's mother, who promised a lot, but did not keep her word
 Arkady Trusov - Uncle Pasha, the janitor
 Alexander Sherstobaev - Vanya Dykhov

1st Series
 Fyodor Nikitin — Sergey Petrovich Bells
 Liya Akhedzhakova — Elizabeth Nikolaevna,Geography Teacher  
 Anatoli Stolbov — Sergey Stepanovich

Series 1 Episodes 
 Rostislav Shmyrev -  director of the school 
 Alexander Bespaly -  employee of Gorgaz 
 Vladimir Sichkar -  driver of the emergency vehicle 
 Georgiy Ruchimsky -  Boris Sergeevich, Teacher of Singing 
 Maria Zinkevich - "1st public woman"
 Margarita Gromova -  2nd publicist 
 Elena Surkova
 Gera Mitter
 Vanya Pavlov
 Andrey Vertel -  Alexeyev, classmate of Denis Korablev 
 Julia Shirokopytova -  classmate

2nd Series 
 Boris Gitin - "Uncle Sasha, a friend of Dennis's Dad" 
 Sergei Belyak-  The Bike Ripper

Series 2 Episodes 
 Anatoliy Kuznecov — the Hitcher with raspberries
 Alexander Guy — Nikolai Ivanovich, bulldozer driver
 Alexandra Zimina - "Grandma Kostika, who was played by Fantômas with a gas stove"
 Nina Rozanceva - buldozerer
 Vladimir Gritsevsky - "militiaman"
 Ninel Zhukovskaya — emergency doctor
 Svetlana Turov
 Vitaliy Rozstalnyj — Grisha,a worker on a construction site with a Jackhammer
 Tatyana Marovskaja
 Andrew Palos
 Alexander Milyayev
 Victor Ababurko
 Sergey Lazarenko

Film Crew
 Screenplay Denis Dragunsky
 Directors: Vitali Kanevsky, Igor Dobrolyubov, Dmitri Mikhleyev

Filming
It was filmed in Minsk, Belarus for 7 months. The school hallway scenes were filmed at school number 115 and the episode when Mishka tells Denis what he loves and when Levka gives Dennis a sleeve was filmed at school 122 in Minsk. The classroom scenes were filmed in the studio.The train scenes were filmed on an inoperative railway line in the Smolevichi region. The train consisted of a locomotive and three carriages. The tower that Dennis was afraid to jump from was filmed in Smolevchi. Vladimir's regular dark blond hair was painted with hydrogen peroxide which caused it to become a lighter shade of blond in the film. During the scenes where Dennis cries, Vladimir said that "glycerin was instilled on the set. The eyes immediately began to pinch, and tears appeared. True, once they were real. The director took the football tickets away from me, and I cried with resentment. The stage was filmed and the tickets were given to me." Georgy fondly recalls that"The assistants came to school and took me out of school, it was such happiness!". Vladimir Stankevich said that Georgy,"stuttered for real, and they wanted him to take a stunt double for voice acting, but when he tried to voice himself, he stuttered exactly in the same places as during the filming."

Music 
 "Secret to the whole world"  Big Children's Choir. Solo by Dima Viktorov
 "When my friends are with me" Big Children's Choir. Solo by Dima Golov
 " At the far station I'll go " - Gennady Belov

Lyrics by Mikhail Tanich,composed by Vladimir Shainsky.

References

Sources
 Unofficial Denisky Stories site with info on the film »
 IMDB Page
.https://aif.ru/culture/showbiz/40303.
https://www.kino-teatr.ru/kino/history/1/393/

1976 films
Russian television films